Delta Air Transport (abbreviated DAT) was a Belgian regional airline headquartered in Antwerp, Belgium, operating scheduled and chartered flights, mostly on short-haul routes. It served a multitude of regional European destinations on behalf of Sabena during the 1990s and early 2000s.

History
Delta Air Transport was founded in 1966, by Frans Van den Bergh, as a provider for air taxi and charter flight services with an initial fleet of three Cessna aircraft (one each of the types Skymaster, 210 and 206). DAT's first scheduled flight from Antwerp to Amsterdam on behalf of KLM took place on 19 September 1967; for that purpose two Beechcraft Queen Air feederliners had been acquired (some sources erroneously mention three of the type).

Operations grew when the larger Douglas DC-3 and DC-6 joined the fleet over the following years, allowing DAT to operate charter flights on behalf of KLM (which owned a 33.3 percent stake in DAT), Sabena, Crossair and BIAS. In 1973, the majority of the airline's stake was bought by Compagnie Maritime Belge. During 1974, a Boeing 720 was leased, allowing DAT to offer worldwide charter flights under the Delta International branding, which soon turned out to be unsuccessful, though.

In 1986, Sabena acquired a 49 percent stake in DAT, and an increasing number of flights were operated on behalf of the Belgian national airline henceforth (also adopting the airline codes of Sabena), using a fleet of British Aerospace 146 aircraft, in favor of which other airliners were gradually phased out. DAT became a member of the European Regional Airlines Association in 1993. In 1996, Sabena bought the remaining KLM stake, thus DAT became a wholly owned Sabena subsidiary, moved its headquarters from Antwerp to Brussels and was re-branded as DAT Belgian Regional Airline, offering low-cost flights. Gradually, the livery of Sabena was applied to all DAT aircraft.

On 1 November 2001, Sabena collapsed due to financial difficulties. DAT could re-launch its operations on 10 November with a flight to Geneva, having received all of Sabena's slots at Brussels Airport and thus being able to maintain the successful European network. Freddy Van Gaever, its former CEO, planned to merge DAT with Virgin Express and add flights to the United States using former Sabena aircraft, which was why the new DAT Plus branding was adopted. Actually, DAT came under the umbrella of SN Airholding (the liquidator of Sabena) in 2002, and was re-organized under a new AOC as SN Brussels Airlines, which later became Brussels Airlines after indeed merging with Virgin Express, today's flag carrier of the country.

Destinations
In its early years, Delta Air Transport offered up to 4 daily scheduled flights between its then base at Antwerp Airport and Amsterdam Airport Schiphol on behalf of KLM (the contract lasted until 1997, when DAT had become a wholly owned Sabena subsidiary), as well as a limited number of routes to the neighboring countries. During the 1990s and early 2000s, DAT was able to grow an extensive short-haul network, as more and more flights were operated on behalf of demising Sabena, eventually becoming the tenth largest regional airline of the continent, transporting more than 1.7 million passengers per year. During its height, the airline had nearly 800 employees, and served the following cities on a scheduled basis from its hub at Brussels Airport:

Austria
Vienna
Bulgaria
Sofia
Croatia
Zagreb
Czech Republic
Prague
Denmark
Copenhagen
Finland
Helsinki
France
Bordeaux
Paris
Lyon
Marseille
Nice
Strasbourg
Toulouse

Germany
Berlin
Düsseldorf
Frankfurt
Hamburg
Hanover
Munich
Stuttgart
Greece
Athens
Hungary
Budapest
Ireland
Dublin
Italy
Bologna
Florence
Milan
Naples
Rome
Turin
Venice

Luxemburg
Luxembourg
The Netherlands
Amsterdam
Norway
Oslo
Poland
Warsaw
Portugal
Lisbon
Porto
Romania
Bucharest
Spain
Barcelona
Bilbao
Madrid
Málaga
Seville
Valencia

Sweden
Gothenburg
Stockholm
Switzerland
Basel
Geneva
Zurich
United Kingdom
Birmingham
Bristol
Edinburgh
Glasgow
Leeds
London
Manchester
Newcastle

Fleet

Over the years, Delta Air Transport operated the following aircraft types:

Accidents and incidents
On 4 October 1974 at 20:01 local time, the flight engineer of a DAT Douglas DC-6 (registered OO-VGB) decided to retract the nose gear during take-off run at London Southend Airport even though the aircraft had not yet lifted off, which happened due to a communication error with the pilots. The airplane slid along the runway, during which it was damaged beyond repair. 99 passengers had been on board the flight to Antwerp, one of which was severely injured (another four received minor injuries from evacuating the aircraft). The six crew members remained uninjured.
On 2 June 1990 at 19:11 local time, a DAT Embraer EMB 120 Brasilia (registered OO-DTA) without any passengers collided with a Piper Aerostar during a low-pass manoeuvre at Antwerp International Airport, resulting in the crash of the Piper and the death of the four people on board. The two aircraft had been performing a close formation flight for aerial photographs of the DAT Embraer for advertising purposes.

References

Further reading 

 

Defunct airlines of Belgium
Airlines established in 1966
Airlines disestablished in 2002
2002 disestablishments in Belgium
Belgian companies established in 1966